Laura Xmas is the thirteenth studio album by Italian singer Laura Pausini, released on November 4, 2016. It is her first with Christmas music. 

The album was released in two versions: in English and Spanish (this version being called Laura Navidad). A special French version of the album was released, with the song Noël Blanc substituting White Christmas. The song Astro del ciel is performed in Italian and Adeste Fideles in Latin.

Track listings

English version (Laura Xmas)

Spanish version (Laura Navidad)

French version

Charts

Weekly charts

Year-end charts

Certifications

References

External links 
 Laura Pausini – Official Website

2016 Christmas albums
Laura Pausini albums
Italian-language albums
Spanish-language albums
Pop Christmas albums
French-language albums
Christmas albums by Italian artists